Karol Bagh is a neighbourhood in Central District of Delhi, India. It is a mixed residential and commercial neighborhood known for shopping streets such as the Ghaffar Market and Ajmal Khan Road.

It was home to the Karol Bagh Lok Sabha constituency until it was abolished in 2008.

Residential areas W.E.A, Beadon Pura, Reghar Pura, Dev Nagar, and Bapa Nagar have a mix of commercial activities such as wholesale markets Tank Road Garment Market and Hardhyan Singh Road Leather market.

Tank Road wholesale garment market came into existence with a few shopkeepers at the end of the 1980s. It offers multiple stores for ethnic women's wear i.e. suits, sarees, and lehengas.

Etymology
The name Karol Bagh, also spelled Qarol Bagh, derives from the Hindi-Urdu words "Qarol" (क़रोल, قرول) meaning "curved like green chilly" and "Bagh" (बाग़, باغ) meaning "garden". The place was named for the numerous herbal gardens in the area.

History
In the 1920s, the villages of Madhoganj, Jaisingh Pura, Raja ka Bazaar and others were evacuated to build Connaught Place and nearby areas. The villagers were relocated once to the west of Karol Bagh, then to a second rocky area populated by trees and bushes.

Karol Bagh was primarily populated with Muslims until the mass exodus to Pakistan at the time of the Partition of India in 1947, which also resulted in an influx of refugees from West Punjab and Sindh, many of whom were traders. There is a sizable Marathi-speaking population, a Tamil-speaking population,  and a large Bengali community, most of whom are employed in jewellery manufacturing. Karol Bagh hosts one of the oldest Durga Puja in the city. 

There were incidents at Karol Bagh during the 1984 anti-Sikh riots, including burning of shops. Karol Bagh was the target of a terrorist bomb blast in Ghaffar Market in October 2008.

Education

The historic Ayurvedic and Unani Tibbia College was inaugurated here by Mahatma Gandhi in 1921, and Sri Guru Nanak Dev Khalsa College of Delhi University is situated here.

Markets
Karol Bagh is popular with affluent people of West and Central Delhi for shopping, with busy markets including Ajmal Khan Road, Arya Samaj Road, the Ghaffar Market (named after freedom fighter Khan Abdul Ghaffar Khan), and Tip Top Market (Established by Sh Sohan Lal Jain in 2000). Western businesses Pizza Hut, TGIF, Reebok, Skechers, Puma and Lacoste have established in Karol Bagh. Eateries include Pind Balluchi. The Karol Bagh market is one of the oldest shopping centers in Delhi. The market offers variety from big air-conditioned showrooms to small and dainty shops in alleys. 

Many areas of the market specialise in a particular field: 

 Ajmal Khan Road once specialised in inexpensive ready-made garments, cotton yarn, and embroidered garments. Now this road has large stores and international labels, along with Indian munchies and masalas (spices).

 Arya Samaj Road specialises in second-hand books.

 Bank Street is known for its jewellery shops, especially jewellery for the bridal trousseau.

 Ghaffar Market has a diverse array of products, ranging from cosmetics to watches to cell phones to footwear.

Transport

The nearest railway stations are Delhi Sarai Rohilla and Delhi Kishanganj, both about a kilometer from Central Karol Bagh. Karol Bagh is situated at a distance of 20 – 22 km. from the Indira Gandhi International Airport, and 4.1 km. from New Delhi Railway Station.
It is also serviced by the Karol Bagh station, located on the Blue Line of the Delhi Metro. One can see famous giant statue of lord Hanuman between Jhandewalan and Karol Bagh metro station. Also its Education hub of IAS Academy in New Delhi. The Pin Code of Karol Bagh is 110005. Also there are so many frequent taxi services are available in Delhi to reach Karol Bagh. The following public transportation transit lines have routes that pass near Karol Bagh Bus Bus: 208, 310, 522A, 753, 807A, 894CL, EXP-85A.

Gallery

In popular culture
A TV series shown on Zee TV, 12/24 Karol Bagh (2009–2010),  was shot and produced in Delhi. Its subsequent success started the trend for many TV serials being set in Delhi. Zoya Singh Solanki the central character in the romantic comedy novel by Anuja Chauhan, The Zoya Factor (2008) lives in Karol Bagh, who ends up becoming the lucky mascot for the Indian cricket team in the novel. In recent years the 108-foot Hanuman statue has become an iconic landmark marking the entrance to Karol Bagh and is seen regularly featured in Bollywood movies showcasing New Delhi. 
In the 2021 movie Bell Bottom, Akshay Kumar's character lived in Gurudwara Road, Karol Bagh .
In the movie Befikre, Ranveer Singh's character lived in Karol Bagh. There's a dialogue that says "you might have left Karol Bagh, but Karol Bagh hasn't left you".

References

Neighbourhoods in Delhi
District subdivisions of Delhi
Central Delhi district
Cities and towns in Central Delhi district